Tosohatchee Wildlife Management Area is located along the St. Johns River east of Orlando in Christmas on Taylor Creek Road, off SR 50.

Flora
The wildlife management area (WMA) contains 1000 acres of old growth floodplain swamp, twenty to forty acres of old growth mesic flatwoods and an unknown acreage of old growth hydric hammock.

Fauna
Among the wildlife of this  wildlife management area (WMA) are song birds, wading birds and migratory waterfowl. The WMA is home to bald eagle, turkey, hawks, and  owls, as well as white-tailed deer, bobcat, fox squirrel, and  gray fox. Other animals that can be seen at the park are alligator, otter, and turtles. The WMA also contains rare and endangered plants.

Recreational Activities
Activities include hiking, biking, and primitive back-pack camping, as well as horseback riding, hunting, fishing, geocaching,and nature study.

Amenities include access to the St. Johns River, a horse camp, a youth camp, two primitive backpack campsites, and more than fifty miles of trails. However, during the rainy season the trails may be under water.

References

 http://funandsun.com/parks/Tosohatchee/tosohatchee.html
 http://www.nbbd.com/godo/tosohatchee/index.html
 http://myfwc.com/viewing/recreation/wmas/lead/tosohatchee Florida Fish and Wildlife Management Conservation Commission

Protected areas of Orange County, Florida
Wildlife management areas of Florida